AxeWound is a British-Canadian heavy metal supergroup formed in 2012 comprising Liam Cormier of Cancer Bats on lead vocals, Matthew Tuck of Bullet for My Valentine on guitar and backing vocals, Mike Kingswood of Glamour of the Kill on guitar, Joe Copcutt of Zoax and formerly of Rise to Remain playing bass and Jason Bowld of Pitchshifter and Bullet for My Valentine on drums.

The band was officially unveiled on 1 May 2012 on the BBC Radio 1 Rock Show with their lead single, "Post Apocalyptic Party", premiered the same night, and made available for free download. The same day, they were confirmed to sub-headline the Pepsi Max Third Stage at Download Festival 2012, on 8 June, underneath the Devin Townsend Project. Tuck announced that Avenged Sevenfold guitarist Synyster Gates will guest on the title track of the debut album. It was confirmed in Kerrang! Magazine that the debut album would be entitled Vultures. It was also confirmed four track titles: "Vultures", "Post Apocalyptic Party", "Cold" and "Blood Money and Lies". AxeWound's debut album Vultures was released on 2 October 2012.

Band members
Liam Cormier – lead vocals
Matthew Tuck – rhythm guitar, vocals
Mike Kingswood – lead guitar
Joe Copcutt – bass
Jason Bowld – drums, percussion

Discography

Studio albums

Music videos

References

External links
Official website

British metalcore musical groups
Groove metal musical groups
Heavy metal supergroups
Musical quintets
Musical groups established in 2012